As of July 2016, the International Union for Conservation of Nature (IUCN) lists 6919 least concern invertebrate species. 38% of all evaluated invertebrate species are listed as least concern. 
The IUCN also lists 32 invertebrate subspecies as least concern.

No subpopulations of invertebrates have been evaluated by the IUCN.

This is a complete list of least concern invertebrate species and subspecies as evaluated by the IUCN.

Nemertea species
Argonemertes hillii

Molluscs

There are 2437 mollusc species and five mollusc subspecies assessed as least concern.

Cnidaria
There are 301 species in the phylum Cnidaria assessed as least concern.

Hydrozoa

Anthozoa
There are 293 species in the class Anthozoa assessed as least concern.

Actinaria
Golden anemone (Condylactis aurantiaca)
Fat anemone (Cribrinopsis crassa)

Alcyonacea
Clavularia crassa

Scleractinia
There are 290 species in the order Scleractinia assessed as least concern.

Dendrophylliids

Acroporids

Oculinids

Meandrinids

Poritids

Brain corals

Pocilloporids

Mussids

Pectiniids

Siderastreids

Agariciids

Merulinids

Caryophylliids

Fungiids

Astrocoeniids

Rhizangiids
Astrangia poculata

Arthropods
There are 4069 arthropod species and 27 arthropod subspecies assessed as least concern.

Echinoderms
There are 111 echinoderm species assessed as least concern.

Sea cucumbers

See also 
 Lists of IUCN Red List least concern species
 List of near threatened invertebrates
 List of vulnerable invertebrates
 List of endangered invertebrates
 List of critically endangered invertebrates
 List of recently extinct invertebrates
 List of data deficient invertebrates

References 

Invertebrates
Least concern invertebrates